Philip Christopher Baldwin (22 May 1985) is a British gay human rights activist known for campaigning on LGBT and HIV awareness.
He is a member of the House of Laity of the General Synod of the Church of England. The 2021 and 2022 Pride Power Lists included him.

Early life and education
Baldwin attended Fettes College from 1996 to 2003 where he experienced bullying and homophobia.
From 2003 to 2006, Baldwin studied history at Oriel College, University of Oxford. He studied an MPhil in the history of art and architecture at Peterhouse College, Cambridge.

Life and activism
Baldwin worked in financial services in London and New York from 2009 to 2015. In January 2010, at the age of 24, he was diagnosed with HIV. Baldwin is a former atheist and now practises Christianity.
Baldwin has campaigned about LGBT rights, HIV, awareness and faith inclusion of LGBT people.
He is an ambassador for the LGBT charity Stonewall. Other charity organisations he has worked with include Rainbow Migration, Positively UK, the Albert Kennedy Trust and the Terrence Higgins Trust.
Lay members of the Deanery Synod elected Baldwin to the eleventh General Synod of the Church of England in 2021.
Out News Global's 2022 Pride Power List placed Baldwin at number eighty-nine.
Baldwin collects English portraiture from 1750 to 1780, including works by founders of the Royal Academy of Arts. In 2014, Baldwin claimed that upon his death he will bequeath Portrait of the Artist’s Wife by Nathaniel Hone and Portrait of a Gentleman by Daniel Gardner to the Ashmolean Museum, the Fitzwilliam Museum and the National Portrait Gallery, London.

References 

English LGBT rights activists
HIV/AIDS activists
1985 births
Living people
LGBT Christians
Members of the General Synod of the Church of England
Alumni of Peterhouse, Cambridge
Alumni of Oriel College, Oxford